Dayton Callie (born 1946) is an American actor, best known for playing Charlie Utter on HBO's Deadwood, former Police Chief Wayne Unser on Sons of Anarchy, and Jeremiah Otto on AMC's Fear the Walking Dead. He has also voiced Whitaker in Valve's Left 4 Dead 2, appeared in Halloween II, and had small roles in episodes of The Unit and Seinfeld. He was also in two episodes of the short-lived NBC series The Cape as the Mayor, and had a three-episode arc on CSI.

Filmography

Film

Television

Video Games

Awards and nominations

References

External links 

1946 births
American male film actors
American male television actors
Living people